The following is a list of equipment of the Land Forces of the Democratic Republic of the Congo from creation to present day.

Small arms

Anti-tank and missile

Armoured vehicles

Artillery

Air defense

References

Equipment
Military Equipment
Congo, Democratic Republic